In algebra, Posner's theorem states that given a prime polynomial identity algebra A with center Z, the ring  is a central simple algebra over , the field of fractions of Z. It is named after Ed Posner.

References 

 
 Edward C. Posner, Prime rings satisfying a polynomial identity, Proc. Amer. Math. Soc. 11 (1960), pp. 180–183. 

Theorems in ring theory